The old varsity high school, Vancouver & District Inter-High School Football League Senior Championships (1934 to 1965) became the Shrine Bowl Provincial Championships (1966 to 1975).

Notes
The V&D Championship continued to be played between teams in Greater Vancouver after the start of the provincial championship in 1966 until at least 1983.

References
 (2005) Subway Bowl program, p. 25

External links
"Vasity Champions of the Past" 

High school football in Canada
Canadian football competitions
Canadian football in Vancouver